Micheal Andrew Kott (born June 17, 1961) is an American actor. He works in theatre, film and achieved recognition for his role in a Chicago production of Blood Brothers, winning a Jeni Award for Best Performance by a Supporting Actor in a Musical in 1997. He was also seen as Morrie in Tuesdays With Morrie. Most recently he received critical acclaim  for his role as the Psychic in the horror film Secrets Of The Clown. Micheal was most recently  seen in the Chicago premiere of Rupert Holmes' rarely produced Solitary Confinement.  Micheal was last seen as Bernadette in JPAC's production of Priscilla Queen of the Desert.

Currently, Micheal is the Associate Dean of the Learning Resource Center at Morton College, Cicero, Illinois.  He was recently appointed to a one year term on the CARLI Board of Directors.  His one year term ended in June 2019

His directing credits include Chicago productions of Doubt, Exact Change, The Boys Next Door, Grey Gardens, Das Barbecue. and Anthony Shaffer's Murderer.

External links

Morton College Webpage

References

American male film actors
Living people
1961 births
American male stage actors
American male television actors